Chehales Tapscott (born July 20, 1990), nicknamed Chey,  is an American professional basketball player for Ibaraki Robots in Japan.  On November 1, 2013 he was selected in the fourth round (61st overall) of the 2013 NBA Development League Draft by the Maine Red Claws.

Career statistics 

|-
| align="left" |  2014-15
| align="left" | Nara
| 52 ||  || 35.2 || .499 || .293 || .663 || 9.4 || 2.5 || 1.5 || 0.7 ||  18.5
|-
| align="left" | 2015-16
| align="left" | Oita
| 50 || 50 || 36.5 || .513 || .366 || .735 || 12.0 || 3.1 || 2.1 || 0.5 ||  22.7 
|-
| align="left" |  2016-17
| align="left" | Kagawa
| 59 || 57 || 29.3 || .451 || .309 || .716 || 9.3 || 3.2 || 1.8 || 0.7 || bgcolor="CFECEC"| 19.5
|-
| align="left" |  2017-18
| align="left" | Ehime
|60|| || 29.0|| .492|| .317|| .792|| 9.3||4.1 || 1.1|| 0.6|| bgcolor="CFECEC"|22.1
|-

References

External links
Portland State Vikings bio

1990 births
Living people
American expatriate basketball people in Australia
American expatriate basketball people in Japan
American expatriate basketball people in Luxembourg
American men's basketball players
Bambitious Nara players
Ehime Orange Vikings players
Forwards (basketball)
Kagawa Five Arrows players
Kumamoto Volters players
Portland State Vikings men's basketball players
Sportspeople from Hillsboro, Oregon